The West African pygmy herring (Sierrathrissa leonensis) is a very small fish, reaching a maximum length of  SL. It is a member of the herring family Clupeidae, and belongs to a radiation of the subfamily Pellonulinae in the freshwater systems of western and central Africa that includes such species as the Microthrissa royauxi of the Congo River basin and Limnothrissa miodon of Lake Tanganyika. It is the only species of its genus.

Description
A very small fish which shows a reduction in size and some neoteny when compared to its larger relatives.

Habitat and ecology
The West African pygmy herring is found in rivers and man-made lakes. It feeds on plankton, especially cladocerans.

Distribution
The West African pygmy herring has a widespread but patchy distribution from Senegal to Cameroon. In west Africa it occurs in Senegal River, Gambia River, Bia River, Niger River basin and Wouri River, as well as the man made Lake Volta and Lake Kainji. This species is native to Cameroon, Ivory Coast, Ghana, Nigeria, Gambia, Senegal and Sierra Leone.

Fisheries and conservation
As the West African pygmy herring has a widespread distribution and is short lived with high resilience to exploitation, it is therefore listed as Least Concern. In Nigeria this species is subject to some commercial fishing for human consumption.

Taxonomy
The West African pygmy herring was first described from Sierra Leone, but this was somewhat controversial and claims were made that the specimens were nothing more than the unmetamorphosed larva of a species of Pellonula or of Cynothrissa.  However, when fully mature specimens of Sierrathrissa were described at 21-28mm SL, it was clear that these were not juveniles of other species.

References

West African pygmy herring
Freshwater fish of West Africa
West African pygmy herring